Jeffrey Richards (born c.1945) is a British historian.

Educated at Jesus College, Cambridge, he is Professor of Cultural History at Lancaster University. A leading cultural historian and film critic, he is the author of over 15 books on British cultural history. His books include The Popes and the Papacy in the Early Middle Ages 476–752 (1979), and Sir Henry Irving: A Victorian Actor and His World (2005). He is also a Companion of the Guild of St George.

Selected publications

References

External links
 Jeffrey Richards' homepage

1940s births
Living people
Academics of Lancaster University
Alumni of Jesus College, Cambridge
British historians
Guild of St George